St George Barracks (not St George's Barracks) was a military installation at Gosport, Hampshire. In addition to the guard house, barrack blocks, the sergeant's mess and the gymnasium all survive and are Grade II listed buildings.

History
The barracks were designed to accommodate an infantry regiment in transit for operations overseas and were built between 1856 and 1859. Initially named "New Barracks", the barracks were built in the colonial style with flat roofs and verandas. The site was first occupied by the 86th (Royal County Down) Regiment of Foot in August 1859. A gymnasium was added in 1868.

During the Second World War the barracks were used by the Royal Navy as a training facility for new recruits, initially under the name of HMS Victory IV and then as HMS St George. After the War the barracks were occupied by the 3rd Royal Tank Regiment and were renamed St George Barracks. The barracks were handed over to the 20 Landing Craft Tank Support Regiment, Royal Corps of Transport in 1968 and, after that unit vacated the barracks. They continued in Ministry of Defence civilian use until 1998 when they were handed back to the Crown Estate for disposal; the site was subsequently acquired for residential use.

References

Barracks in England
Installations of the British Army